Ördüc (also, Orduch and Urduch) is a village and municipality in the Quba Rayon of Azerbaijan.  It has a population of 200.

References 

Populated places in Quba District (Azerbaijan)